The concept of mass in general relativity (GR) is more subtle to define than the concept of mass in special relativity. In fact, general relativity does not offer a single definition of the term mass, but offers several different definitions that are applicable under different circumstances. Under some circumstances, the mass of a system in general relativity may not even be defined.

The reason for this subtlety is that the energy and momentum in the gravitational field cannot be unambiguously localized. So, rigorous definitions of the mass in general relativity are not local, as in classical mechanics or special relativity, but make reference to the asymptotic nature of the spacetime. A well defined notion of the mass exists for asymptotically flat spacetimes and for asymptotically Anti-de Sitter space. However, these definitions must be used with care in other settings.

Defining mass in general relativity: concepts and obstacles 
In special relativity, the rest mass of a particle can be defined unambiguously in terms of its energy and momentum as described in the article on mass in special relativity. Generalizing the notion of the energy and momentum to general relativity, however, is subtle. The main reason for this is that that gravitational field itself contributes to the energy and momentum. However, the "gravitational field energy" is not a part of the energy–momentum tensor; instead, what might be identified as the contribution of the gravitational field to a total energy is part of the Einstein tensor on the other side of Einstein's equation (and, as such, a consequence of these equations' non-linearity).  While  in certain situations it is possible to rewrite the equations so that part of the "gravitational energy" now stands alongside the other source terms in the form of the stress–energy–momentum pseudotensor, this separation is not true for all observers, and there is no general definition for obtaining it.

How, then, does one define a concept as a system's total mass which is easily defined in classical mechanics?  As it turns out, at least for spacetimes which are asymptotically flat (roughly speaking, which represent some isolated gravitating system in otherwise empty and gravity-free infinite space), the ADM 3+1 split leads to a solution: as in the usual Hamiltonian formalism, the time direction used in that split has an associated energy, which can be integrated up to yield a global quantity known as the ADM mass (or, equivalently, ADM energy).  Alternatively, there is a possibility to define mass for a spacetime that is stationary, in other words, one that has a time-like Killing vector field (which, as a generating field for time, is canonically conjugate to energy); the result is the so-called Komar mass  Although defined in a totally different way, it can be shown to be equivalent to the ADM mass for stationary spacetimes. The Komar integral definition can also be generalized to non-stationary fields for which there is at least an asymptotic time translation symmetry; imposing a certain gauge condition, one can define the Bondi energy at null infinity.  In a way, the ADM energy measures all of the energy contained in spacetime, while the Bondi energy excludes those parts carried off by gravitational waves to infinity.  Great effort has been expended on proving positivity theorems for the masses just defined, not least because positivity, or at least the existence of a lower limit, has a bearing on the more fundamental question of boundedness from below: if there were no lower limit to the energy, then no isolated system would be absolutely stable; there would always be the possibility of a decay to a state of even lower total energy.  Several kinds of proofs that both the ADM mass and the Bondi mass are indeed positive exist; in particular, this means that Minkowski space (for which both are zero) is indeed stable.  While the focus here has been on energy, analogue definitions for global momentum exist; given a field of angular Killing vectors and following the Komar technique, one can also define global angular momentum.

Quasi-local quantities 
The disadvantage of all the definitions mentioned so far is that they are defined only at (null or spatial) infinity; since the 1970s, physicists and mathematicians have worked on the more ambitious endeavor of defining suitable quasi-local quantities, such as the mass of an isolated system defined using only quantities defined within a finite region of space containing that system.  However, while there is a variety of proposed definitions such as the Hawking energy, the Geroch energy or Penrose's quasi-local energy–momentum based on twistor methods, the field is still in flux.  Eventually, the hope is to use a suitable defined quasi-local mass to give a more precise formulation of the hoop conjecture, prove the so-called Penrose inequality for black holes (relating the black hole's mass to the horizon area) and find a quasi-local version of the laws of black hole mechanics.

Types of mass in general relativity

Komar mass in stationary spacetimes 

A non-technical definition of a stationary spacetime is a spacetime where none of the metric coefficients  are functions of time.  The Schwarzschild metric of a black hole and the Kerr metric of a rotating black hole are common examples of stationary spacetimes.

By definition, a stationary spacetime exhibits time translation symmetry.  This is technically called a time-like Killing vector.  Because the system has a time translation symmetry, Noether's theorem guarantees that it has a conserved energy.  Because a stationary system also has a well defined rest frame in which its momentum can be considered to be zero, defining the energy of the system also defines its mass.  In general relativity, this mass is called the Komar mass of the system.  Komar mass can only be defined for stationary systems.

Komar mass can also be defined by a flux integral.  This is similar to the way that Gauss's law defines the charge enclosed by a surface as the normal electric force multiplied by the area.  The flux integral used to define Komar mass is slightly different from that used to define the electric field, however the normal force is not the actual force, but the "force at infinity".  See the main article for more detail.

Of the two definitions, the description of Komar mass in terms of a time translation symmetry provides the deepest insight.

ADM and Bondi masses in asymptotically flat space-times 

If a system containing gravitational sources is surrounded by an infinite vacuum region, the geometry of the space-time will tend to approach the flat Minkowski geometry of special relativity at infinity. Such space-times are known as "asymptotically flat" space-times.

For systems in which space-time is asymptotically flat, the ADM and Bondi energy, momentum, and mass can be defined.  In terms of Noether's theorem, the ADM energy, momentum, and mass are defined by the asymptotic symmetries at spatial infinity, and the Bondi energy, momentum, and mass are defined by the asymptotic symmetries at null infinity.  Note that mass is computed as the length of the energy–momentum four-vector, which can be thought of as the energy and momentum of the system "at infinity".

The ADM energy is defined through the following flux integral at infinity. If a spacetime is asymptotically flat this means that near "infinity" the metric tends to that of flat space. The asymptotic deviations of the metric away from flat space can be parametrized by 

where  is the flat space metric.
The ADM energy is then given by an integral over a surface,  at infinity

The Einstein summation convention is assumed for repeated indices but the sum over k and j only runs over the spatial directions. The use of ordinary derivatives instead of covariant derivatives in the formula above is justified because of the assumption that the asymptotic geometry is flat.

Some intuition for the formula above can be obtained as follows. Imagine that that we take the surface, S, to be a spherical surface so that the normal points radially outwards.

It is also possible to obtain expressions for the momentum in asymptotically flat spacetime. To obtain such an expression one defines

where

Then the momentum is obtained by a flux integral in the asymptotically flat region

Note that the expression for  obtained from the formula above coincides with the expression for the ADM energy given above as can easily be checked using the explicit expression for H.

The Newtonian limit for nearly flat space-times 
In the Newtonian limit, for quasi-static systems in nearly flat space-times, one can approximate the total energy of the system by adding together the non-gravitational components of the energy of the system and then subtracting the Newtonian gravitational binding energy.

Translating the above statement into the language of general relativity, we say that a system in nearly flat space-time has a total non-gravitational energy E and momentum P given by:

When the components of the momentum vector of the system are zero, i.e. Pi = 0, the approximate mass of the system is just (E+Ebinding)/c2, Ebinding being a negative number representing the Newtonian gravitational self-binding energy.

Hence when one assumes that the system is quasi-static, one assumes that there is no significant energy present in the  form of "gravitational waves".  When one assumes that the system is in "nearly-flat" space-time, one assumes that  the metric coefficients are essentially Minkowskian within acceptable experimental error.

The formulas for the total energy and momentum can be seen to arise naturally in this limit as follows. In the linearized limit, the equations of general relativity can be written in the form

In this limit, the total energy-momentum of the system is simply given by integrating the stress-tensor on a spacelike slice.

But using the equations of motion, one can also write this as

Finally, one uses the Gauss law to convert the integral of a divergence over the spatial slice into an integral over a Gaussian sphere 
 
which coincides precisely with the formula for the total momentum given above.

History 
In 1918, David Hilbert wrote about the difficulty in assigning an energy to a "field" and "the failure of the energy theorem" in a correspondence with Klein.  In this letter, Hilbert conjectured that this failure is a characteristic feature of the general theory, and that instead of "proper energy theorems" one had 'improper energy theorems'.

This conjecture was soon proved to be correct by one of Hilbert's close associates, Emmy Noether.  Noether's theorem applies to any system which can be described by an action principle. Noether's theorem associates conserved energies with time-translation symmetries.   When the time-translation symmetry is a finite parameter continuous group, such as the Poincaré group, Noether's theorem defines a scalar conserved energy for the system in question.  However, when the symmetry is an infinite parameter continuous group, the existence of a conserved energy is not guaranteed.  In a similar manner, Noether's theorem associates conserved momenta with space-translations, when the symmetry group of the translations is finite-dimensional.  Because General Relativity is a diffeomorphism invariant theory, it has an infinite continuous group of symmetries rather than a finite-parameter group of symmetries, and hence has the wrong group structure to guarantee a conserved energy.  Noether's theorem has been extremely influential in inspiring and unifying various ideas of mass, system energy, and system momentum in General Relativity.

As an example of the application of Noether's theorem is the example of stationary space-times and their associated Komar mass.(Komar 1959).  While general space-times lack a finite-parameter time-translation symmetry, stationary space-times have such a symmetry, known as a Killing vector.  Noether's theorem proves that such stationary space-times must have an associated conserved energy.  This conserved energy defines a conserved mass, the Komar mass.

ADM mass was introduced (Arnowitt et al., 1960) from an initial-value formulation of general relativity.  It was later reformulated in terms of the group of asymptotic symmetries at spatial infinity, the SPI group,  by various authors. (Held, 1980).  This reformulation did much to clarify the theory, including explaining why ADM momentum and ADM energy transforms as a 4-vector (Held, 1980).  Note that the SPI group is actually infinite-dimensional.  The existence of conserved quantities is because the SPI group of "super-translations" has a preferred 4-parameter subgroup of "pure" translations, which, by Noether's theorem, generates a conserved 4-parameter energy–momentum.  The norm of this 4-parameter energy–momentum is the ADM mass.

The Bondi mass was introduced (Bondi, 1962) in a paper that studied the loss of mass of physical systems via gravitational radiation.  The Bondi mass is also associated with a group of asymptotic symmetries, the BMS group at null infinity.  Like the SPI group at spatial infinity, the BMS group at null infinity is infinite-dimensional, and it also has a preferred 4-parameter subgroup of "pure" translations.

Another approach to the problem of energy in General Relativity is the use of pseudotensors such as the Landau–Lifshitz pseudotensor.(Landau and Lifshitz, 1962). Pseudotensors are not gauge invariant because of this, they only give consistent gauge-independent answers for the total energy when additional constraints (such as asymptotic flatness) are met.  The gauge dependence of pseudotensors also prevents any gauge-independent definition of the local energy density, as every different gauge choice results in a different local energy density.

See also 
 Mass in special relativity
 General relativity
 Conservation of energy
 Komar mass
 Hawking energy
 ADM mass
 Positive mass theorem

Notes

References 

"If you go too fast, do you become a black hole?" Updated by Don Koks 2008. Original by Philip Gibbs 1996. The Original Usenet Physics FAQ

External links 
 "Is energy conserved in General Relativity?

General relativity
Mass
Unsolved problems in physics
Unsolved problems in astronomy